The 2017 IHF World Men's Handball Championship was the 25th event hosted by the International Handball Federation. The event was held in France from 11 to 29 January 2017.

France, in a clean sweep, defended their title by defeating Norway 33–26 in the final, which secured France their sixth title. Slovenia defeated Croatia 31–30 to capture the bronze medal. Norway (from a wildcard) and Slovenia earned their first World Championship medals ever.

The championship set a record of attendance in total of 540,000 spectators with 23 matches being sold out and with a venue record of 28,010 at both of France's knock-out matches in Lille.

Venues
The championship was played at eight venues in Paris-Bercy, Rouen, Nantes, Metz, Albertville, Montpellier, Lille, and Brest. All the venue capacities are the capacity for handball events.

8 venues

Bidding process
Denmark and France were bidding to host the 2017 Men's World Championships. The IHF Council awarded the Men’s and Women’s World Championships 2017 at their meeting on the fringes of the Women’s World Championships in São Paulo, Brazil on Thursday 15 December 2011.

Denmark was the co-host of the 1999 Women’s World Championship and host of the 1978 Men's World Championship. Denmark has also hosted the Women's EHF EURO twice and was awarded with the Men's EHF EURO 2014.

France hosted the Men's World Championships in 1970 and 2001 and was host of the 2007 Women's World Championship.

Qualification
Twenty-four teams participated in the final tournament. France were automatically qualified as hosts. An additional automatic qualification spot was given to the defending champions, but because this was also France, the berth was given to the next best placed team from the last World Championship, losing finalists Qatar. The remaining 22 available places were for the best teams of each continental qualification tournament, the winners of an additional European qualification competition and an additional intercontinental qualification tournament.

Qualified teams

1 Bold indicates champion for that year
2 Italic indicates host country for that year
3 From both German teams only East Germany was qualified in 1990

Draw
The draw was held on 23 June 2016 at 14:00 in Paris, France.

Seeding

Squads

Referees
16 referee pairs are selected:

Preliminary round
The schedule was announced on 23 September 2015.

All times are local (UTC+1).

Group A

Group B

Group C

Group D

Presidents Cup

21st–24th place bracket

21st–24th place semifinals

23rd place game

21st place game

17–20th place bracket

17–20th place semifinals

19th place game

17th place game

Knockout stage

Bracket

Round of 16

Quarterfinals

Semifinals

Third place game

Final

Final ranking
For places 5–16 the criterion was the number of points gained against the teams ranked first to fourth in the preliminary round in their group.

Awards

All-Star Team
All-Star Team of the tournament:
Goalkeeper:  Vincent Gérard
Right wing:  Kristian Bjørnsen
Right back:  Nedim Remili
Centre back:  Domagoj Duvnjak
Left back:  Sander Sagosen
Left wing:  Jerry Tollbring
Pivot:  Bjarte Myrhol

Other awards
Most Valuable Player:  Nikola Karabatić

Statistics

Top goalscorers

Source: IHF

Top goalkeepers

Source: IHF

References

External links
Official website 
IHF website

2017, Men
2017 in French sport
World Championship, Men
World Championship, Men, 2017
January 2017 sports events in France